Their Hour is a 1928 American silent comedy film directed by Alfred Raboch and starring John Harron, Dorothy Sebastian and June Marlowe.

Premise
A shipping clerk falls under the spell of a socialite, but eventually returns to the girl from his own social class who really loves him.

Cast
 John Harron as Jerry  
 Dorothy Sebastian as Cora  
 June Marlowe as Peggy  
 John Roche as Bob  
 Huntley Gordon as Mr. Shaw  
 Myrtle Stedman as Peggy's Mother  
 John Steppling as Peggy's Father  
 Holmes Herbert as Cora's Father

References

Bibliography
 Sharot, Stephen. Love and Marriage Across Social Classes in American Cinema. Springer, 2016.

External links

1928 films
1928 comedy films
Silent American comedy films
Films directed by Alfred Raboch
American silent feature films
1920s English-language films
Tiffany Pictures films
American black-and-white films
1920s American films